is a Japanese anime television series based on the series of children's books of the same name, written by Australian author Emily Rodda. It was announced by Rodda herself at Sydney's Book Council of Australia Conference and at an ABC Kids convention. The series was produced by Genco and SKY Perfect Well Think. It was broadcast for 65 episodes on TV Aichi from January 2007 to March 2008. It began airing on Cartoon Network Australia and New Zealand in May 2010. It premiered in the United States on The Hub on October 10, 2010.

Story
The Shadow Lord, an evil sorcerer and The Lord of Shadows which comes from The Shadowlands, has taken over Deltora by destroying a magical object known as The Belt of Deltora, which is Deltora's only protection against him. Throughout the course of the anime, Lief, Barda and Jasmine travel around the land of Deltora to return the seven gem of the initials of which combine to form DELTORA (hence the name "Deltora Quest") to the belt and save the land. Their first destination is the Forests of Silence.

After destroying the guardian Gorl, they find the Topaz and continue to the Lake of Tears. Along the way, they meet Manus and with his help defeat Jin and Jod, two of the sorceress Thaegan's thirteen children. Eventually, they fight with Thaegan and retrieve the Ruby. Thaegan is defeated when Jasmine's raven, Kree, creates a cut in her finger, causing her to lose blood. Since Thaegan is a witch, she instantly dies as a result of it.

The trio are then trapped by Thaegan's remaining eleven children, but manage to fool them and run away. Then, they visit Tom's mysterious shop and meet a scar-faced man, Doom. Later on they manage to reach the City of Rats. There Lief, Barda and Jasmine get the Opal and then enter the deadly Rithmere Championships. Jasmine wins, and then they are subsequently captured. With the help of the mysterious Doom, they manage to escape and reach the Shifting Sands, where they obtain the Lapis Lazuli. 

They travel to Dread Mountain, passing through Gellick with the help of the Kin. They go on the River Queen, but end up finding out that a few of the passengers were Ols. To avoid putting the other passengers in danger, the trio are dropped off nearby. They go into the Maze of the Beast and are able to find the Amethyst, barely escaping the slug-like Glus. They rescue Dain and find Tora. They then journey to the Valley of the Lost and defeat the guardian. After a series of epic battles on the way to Del and in Deltora, the Shadow Lord is finally banished from Deltora.

Characters
Lief

At the start of the series, Lief is the son of a blacksmith who lives in the run down city of Del. He is (as Barda describes him) 'A young hot-head' and spends his time roaming the streets and both tempting and dodging trouble. On his 16th birthday he leaves Del on his father's quest to find the magical gems missing from the belt of Deltora and the heir destined to wear it. Lief is tempted in many ways and by the end of the first series we see that he has grown not only in bravery and strength, but also in wisdom and patience. Lief is very courageous and extremely trustworthy. Only a few times does he considered giving up the quest but the thought of his friends or allies suffering always helps him to continue.
Barda

At the start of the series Barda appears to be a poor beggar living on the streets of Del. He is revealed to be an ex-palace guard who assumes the role of protector to Lief, much to both his and Lief's dismay. He is a skilled swordsman and frequently makes jokes about being stuck with two young hot-heads Lief and Jasmine. He is about the same age as Lief's parents. He is also the son of Min who was the childhood nurse maid of both Endon and Jarred, who was killed by Prandine when she warned King Endon he was being deceived, but he didn't believe her. During the series, Barda competes in a contest in which he describes his special skill as strength. He helps Lief and Jasmine along the quest and is always strong-hearted, never gives up hope and is rather a gentle giant.
Jasmine

At the start of the series Jasmine is a wild orphan girl who lives a solitary life in the dangerous Forests of Silence. She has messy coal black hair which frames her elfin face and emerald green eyes. She is often described as impatient and lonely but with a good heart. Her only friends in the Forests are the raven named Kree and a small furry animal called Filli. Jasmine understands the language of trees and many other animals. She is independent, like Lief, though she displays far less tact. She is also unafraid of standing up for what she believes in, if she feels something is unjust or incorrect she explains her view without any fear of reprimand. She believes in equal rights and fairness, her only problem is that she cannot understand people who will not fight for themselves. Growing up all alone, Jasmine knows how to fend for herself. She usually gets her own way. Jasmine is unable to comprehend how easily many people can be tricked by fancy words and promises. In the series she finds her long lost father and they are once again reunited. She is about the same age as Lief (16). Also during the series, Jasmine competes in a contest in which she describes her special skill as agility. She shows romantic interest in Lief, even though they don't always see eye to eye. Her father is Jarred, a blacksmith and King Endon's childhood friend who, along with his wife, switched identities with the royal family and went into hiding in the Forest of Silence. Years later Jarred and his wife Anna are captured by Grey Guards, with Anna dying and Jarred being sent to the arena in the Shadowlands, losing his memory in the process
Kree

Filli

The Shadow Lord

Dain

Production
The series was produced by Genco and the animation production at OLM and SKY Perfect Well Think. Rodda was originally approached with many film offers, but it was only this studio that promised to not change the story. The first episode was aired on January 6, 2007, in Japan.

It was directed by Mitsuru Hongō (Spirit of Wonder, Outlaw Star), designed by Hiroyuki Nishimura and Junya Ishigaki, and written by Oketani Arawa, Reiko Yoshida, and Natsuko Takahashi. The music was composed by Kow Otani, but was replaced with an original soundtrack in the English version.

Although the series employs mostly traditional animation it uses CGI for the Guardians.

Deltora Quest was originally licensed in North America by Geneon as one of their final licenses but shut down before doing anything with the series. The series was then rescued by Dentsu's newly established North American branch, and they produced an English version of the series in association with Ocean Productions in Vancouver, British Columbia and recorded at their Calgary-based Blue Water Studios. All music for the English version was composed and produced by John Mitchell and Tom Keenlyside at Anitunes Music Inc.

Due to the series' popularity in Japan, it was extended to 65 episodes from the original 52, containing stories not present in the original novels. The English dub restores the ending of the original novels, and ignores the 13 added episodes in the anime.

Cinedigm released the series onto DVD in a complete boxset on May 13, 2014.

Music

Opening theme
HEART☆BEAT by MARIA (episodes 1–28)
 by AKB48 (episodes 29–52)
 by Delta Goodrem (episodes 53–65)

Ending theme
 by Rythem (episodes 1–14)
Hey Now! by COOLON (episodes 15–26)
Go To Fly by Sunbrain (episodes 27–39)
{{Nihongo|Yume x Yume'''|夢x夢|}} by Yurika Ohyama (episodes 40–52)
 by Hoi festa (episodes 53–65)

The English version uses an original instrumental composed by John Lee Mitchell and Tom Keenlyside for Anitunes Music Inc.

Episodes

Video game
A video game for the Nintendo DS titled Deltora Quest: Nanatsu no Houseki'' was released in Japan by Bandai Namco on September 20, 2007.

References

External links

TV Aichi's Deltora Quest Website 
Old official flash website 
Oriental Light and Magic Website 
Deltora Quest at Crystal Acid
Cartoon Network Japan's Deltora Quest website

Adventure anime and manga
Anime based on novels
Deltora
Fantasy anime and manga
Geneon USA
Japanese children's animated fantasy television series
OLM, Inc.
Television shows based on Australian novels
Television shows based on children's books
Works published under a pseudonym

ja:デルトラ・クエスト
zh:拯救德尔托拉